During the 1916–17 season Hibernian, a football club based in Edinburgh, finished sixteenth out of 20 clubs in the Scottish First Division.

Scottish First Division

Final League table

See also
List of Hibernian F.C. seasons

References

External links
Hibernian 1916/1917 results and fixtures, Soccerbase

Hibernian F.C. seasons
Hibernian